Hi, Mom! is a 1970 American black comedy film written and directed by Brian De Palma, and is one of Robert De Niro's first films. De Niro reprises his role of Jon Rubin from Greetings (1968). In this film, Rubin is a fledgling "adult filmmaker" who has an idea to post cameras at his window and film his neighbors.

Plot
Returned Vietnam veteran and aspiring filmmaker Jon Rubin (Robert De Niro) is hired by producer Joe Banner (Allen Garfield) to make a pornographic film. Rubin, who has been spying on his neighbor Judy Bishop (Jennifer Salt), uses the opportunity to seduce her and secretly film the two of them having sexual intercourse using a camera mounted on his apartment window. The camera tilts during filming, spoiling the results, and the displeased Banner withdraws his offer.

Rubin then joins an experimental acting troupe headed by another of his neighbors (Gerrit Graham). The troupe mounts a production called Be Black Baby! Later, a group of white theater patrons attend a performance by the troupe. First they are forced to eat soul food. The white audience is then subjected to wearing shoe polish on their faces, while the African American actors sport whiteface and terrorize the people in blackface.  The white audience members attempt to escape from the building and are ambushed in the elevator by the troupe. As two of the black actors rape one of the white audience members, Rubin arrives in the character of an NYPD policeman and arrests members of the white audience under the pretense that they are black. The sequence concludes with a thoroughly battered and abused audience raving about the show on public television.

Rubin decides to remain in the city and stay with the troupe. He marries Judy and finds work as an insurance salesman. The film ends with Rubin planting a bomb in the building where he lives with Judy, demolishing it. He watches the devastation from the street and speaks to a TV reporter.

Cast

MPAA rating board
According to the 1972 book The Movie Rating Game by Stephen Farber, the film was originally given an "X" rating by the Motion Picture Association of America (MPAA), but after a few minor trims, it was approved for an R. The main cut occurred during the scene where Gerrit Graham paints his entire body for the Be Black, Baby performance. He hesitated for a moment about painting his penis, and then finally finished the job. The actual painting of the penis was deleted to obtain the R.

Reception
Roger Greenspun of The New York Times wrote that the film "stands out for its wit, its ironic good humor, its multilevel sophistications, its technical ingenuity, its nervousness, and its very special ability to bring the sensibility of the suburbs to the sins of the inner city." Variety stated that the film "is three-fourths of a funny, engaging serio-comedy about a 'peep art' filmmaker and urban guerrilla in New York. Unfortunately, the fourth that fails is the finale which literally and figuratively flops, leaving the audience with a creative promise unfulfilled." Kevin Thomas of the Los Angeles Times wrote, "Satire is a naturally attractive form of expression for young film-makers, but few display the degree of sustained humor, energy and control that De Palma did in 'Greetings' and now even more so in the farther-ranging 'Hi, Mom!' Indeed, his ability to fuse hilarity and anger, spontaneity and discipline, is nothing short of brilliant."

Additional notes
Jennifer Salt and Charles Durning both later worked with DePalma on his suspense thriller 
Sisters. Appearing in a supporting role was Paul Bartel, who later directed Eating Raoul and Scenes from the Class Struggle in Beverly Hills.

See also
 List of American films of 1970
 List of films featuring surveillance

References

External links
 
 
 
 
 

1970 films
1970 comedy-drama films
1970s black comedy films
1970s English-language films
1970s political comedy-drama films
1970s satirical films
American black comedy films
American political comedy-drama films
American political satire films
Films about pornography
Films directed by Brian De Palma
Films set in New York City
1970s American films